This is a list of museums in Nepal.

Museums (General interest)
 National Museum of Nepal
 Bronze and Brass Museum
 Hanumandhoka Palace Complex
 Patan Museum
 Pujarimath Museum
 Kapilvastu Museum
 Children's Art Museum of Nepal
 International Mountain Museum
 Sindhuligadhi War Museum
 The Taragaon Museum

Museums related to rulers

 Tribhuvan Museum
 Mahendra Museum
 Birendra Museum

Museums related to natural history
 Natural History Museum of Nepal
 Annapurna Natural History Museum, Pokhara

See also

 List of museums

External links 
 Museums and art galleries of Nepal

Museums
 
Nepal
Museums
Museums
Nepal